My Secret Life is the fourth and final album by Julee Cruise and was released in 2011. The album was produced by DJ Dmitry of Deee-lite, and was the last album released by Cruise before her death in 2022.

Track listing
"My Secret Life"
"I'm Crazy"
"I Luv U 2 Death"
"A Fatal Beating"
"Your Girl"
"Mine"
"Orbiting Planet Fear"
"Season of the Witch"
"Cloudy Days"
"Bright Shiny Way"
"Only Us"
"I'm Wishing"
"The Bitter Suite" (iTunes Bonus Track)

References

External links
 My Secret Life on iTunes
 My Secret Life on Amazon

2011 albums
Julee Cruise albums